Robert Patrick Ellison B.Sc., S.T.L., C.S.Sp. (born 12 February 1942) is the Roman Catholic Bishop Emeritus of the Diocese of Banjul, Gambia.  He was born in Dublin, County Dublin, Ireland.  
He went to Blackrock College secondary school, and earned a Science Degree from University College Dublin., following which he went to Rome to study theology at Gregorian University and in 1970 was awarded an STL in dogma. After three years in Gambia he returned to study at the Pontifical Institute of Arab and Islamic Studies in Rome.
He was ordained a priest on 6 July 1969, for the Congregation of the Holy Spirit.  On 25 February 2006 he was appointed Bishop of the Diocese of Banjul.  He was ordained a bishop on 14 May 2006.  The Principal Consecrator was Bishop Michael J. Cleary, C. S. Sp.; his Principal Co-Consecrators were Bishop George Sagna, C. S. Sp., and Bishop George Biguzzi, S. X., the bishop of the Diocese of Makeni. Pope Francis accepted his canonical resignation on 30 November 2017.

References

External links

Christian clergy from Dublin (city)
1942 births
Living people
21st-century Roman Catholic bishops in the Gambia
Irish expatriates in the Gambia
Irish expatriate Catholic bishops
Holy Ghost Fathers
Irish Spiritans
People educated at Blackrock College
Alumni of University College Dublin
Pontifical Gregorian University alumni
Roman Catholic bishops of Banjul